This is a list of all tornadoes that were confirmed by local offices of the National Weather Service in the United States from October to December 2012.

United States yearly total

October

October 1 event

October 12 event

October 13 event

October 14 event

October 15 event

October 17 event

October 18 event

October 19 event

October 22 event

November

November 9 event

November 10 event

November 11 event

November 30 event

December

December 9 event

December 10 event

December 14 event

December 17 event

December 19 event

December 20 event

December 22 event

December 25 event

December 26 event

See also
 Tornadoes of 2012

Notes

References

 10
2012-10
Tornado,2012-10
2012, 10
Tornado
Tornado
Tornado